In statistics, Cramér's V (sometimes referred to as Cramér's phi and denoted as φc)  is a measure of association between two nominal variables, giving a value between 0 and +1 (inclusive). It is based on Pearson's chi-squared statistic and was published by Harald Cramér in 1946.

Usage and interpretation

φc is the intercorrelation of two discrete variables and may be used with variables having two or more levels.  φc is a symmetrical measure: it does not matter which variable we place in the columns and which in the rows.  Also, the order of rows/columns doesn't matter, so φc may be used with nominal data types or higher (notably, ordered or numerical).

Cramér's V may also be applied to goodness of fit chi-squared models when there is a 1 × k table (in this case r = 1). In this case k is taken as the number of optional outcomes and it functions as a measure of tendency towards a single outcome. 

Cramér's V varies from 0 (corresponding to no association between the variables) to 1 (complete association) and can reach 1 only when each variable is completely determined by the other. It may be viewed as the association between two variables as a percentage of their maximum possible variation.

φc2 is the mean square canonical correlation between the variables.

In the case of a 2 × 2 contingency table Cramér's V is equal to the absolute value of Phi coefficient.

Note that as chi-squared values tend to increase with the number of cells, the greater the difference between r (rows) and c (columns), the more likely φc will tend to 1 without strong evidence of a meaningful correlation.

Calculation
 number of times the values  were observed.

The chi-squared statistic then is:

Cramér's V is computed by taking the square root of the chi-squared statistic divided by the sample size and the minimum dimension minus 1:

where:
  is the phi coefficient.
  is derived from Pearson's chi-squared test
  is the grand total of observations and
  being  the number of columns.
  being  the number of rows.

The p-value for the significance of V is the same one that is calculated using the Pearson's chi-squared test.

The formula for the variance of V=φc is known.

In R, the function cramerV() from the package rcompanion calculates V using the chisq.test function from the stats package. In contrast to the function cramersV() from the lsr package, cramerV() also offers an option to correct for bias. It applies the correction described in the following section.

Bias correction

Cramér's V can be a heavily biased estimator of its population counterpart and will tend to overestimate the strength of association. A bias correction, using the above notation, is given by
 
where
 
and
 
 
Then  estimates the same population quantity as Cramér's V but with typically much smaller mean squared error. The rationale for the correction is that under independence,
.

See also
Other measures of correlation for nominal data:
 The phi coefficient
 Tschuprow's T
 The uncertainty coefficient
 The Lambda coefficient
 The Rand index
 Davies–Bouldin index
 Dunn index
 Jaccard index 
 Fowlkes–Mallows index

Other related articles:
 Contingency table
 Effect size

References

External links
 A Measure of Association for Nonparametric Statistics (Alan C. Acock and Gordon R. Stavig Page 1381 of 1381–1386)
 Nominal Association: Phi and Cramer's Vl from the homepage of Pat Dattalo.

Statistical ratios
Summary statistics for contingency tables
Covariance and correlation